Vahdatabad (also Romanized as Vaḥdatābād) is a village in Abkosh Rural District, Bord Khun District, Deyr County, Bushehr Province, Iran. At the 2006 census, its population was 369, in 71 families.

References 

Populated places in Deyr County